Santoña is a town in the eastern coast of the autonomous community of Cantabria, on the north coast of Spain. It is situated by the bay of the same name. Santoña is divided into two zones, an urban plain, and a mountainous area, with Mount Buciero at its eastern limit, and Brusco and the beach of Berria to the north. The beach of San Martin comprises its south limit and the fishing harbor and marsh area its western limit.

In August 1719 the town was successfully attacked and captured by French forces supported by the British Royal Navy during the War of the Quadruple Alliance. Extensive naval supplies were seized or destroyed, and along with the Duke of Berwick's simultaneous taking of San Sebastian, put pressure of Philip V to make peace which he subsequently did at the Treaty of The Hague.

Population centres
Santoña, the main town, where most of the population lives.
Dueso, 174 inhabitants in 2008. Location of the Penal de El Dueso prison.
Piedrahíta, 173 inhabitants in 2008.

Notable people
 Juan de la Cosa (1460-1509), cartographer, conquistador, and explorer
 Tomás de Teresa, 800m athlete
 Carrero Blanco, Spanish Navy officer and politician, who served as Prime Minister of Spain
 Osmar Ibáñez, footballer

Trivia 
The song "Santonian shores" of the band Eluveitie is about this region.

References

External links
Ayuntamiento de Santoña
Santoña - Cantabria 102 Municipios

Gallery

Municipalities in Cantabria
Port cities and towns on the Spanish Atlantic coast